Pencarrow Head, also known as Pencarrow, is a headland in the Wellington Region of New Zealand and the name of the surrounding area. The name is Welsh and formed from Pen which translates to English as Head and Carrow which is a burial site. The addition of Head is a translation mistake as Head is already in the name.

It is the eastern headland that marks the entrance to Wellington Harbour. The area is located south of Eastbourne and is part of Lower Hutt. The area is hilly and has no road access; a walking or mountain biking track follows the coast line. The head marks the northern end of Fitzroy Bay.

The main attraction of Pencarrow Head is the Pencarrow Head Lighthouse, the first permanent lighthouse in New Zealand constructed in 1859. It is one of Wellington's most notable heritage locations and New Zealand's only female lighthouse keeper, Mary Bennett, worked here. The return walk from Eastbourne takes four hours.

The Pencarrow lakes, Lake Kohangapiripiri and Lake Kohangatera, are freshwater wetlands that were blocked from the sea by earthquake activity. Stock grazing was discontinued in 2004 and the wetlands are recovering from stock and farming impacts. The area is under joint management by the Department of Conservation and the Greater Wellington Regional Council.

Demographics

Pencarrow had a population of 651 at the 2018 New Zealand census, an increase of 63 people (10.7%) since the 2013 census, and an increase of 78 people (13.6%) since the 2006 census. There were 228 households. There were 312 males and 342 females, giving a sex ratio of 0.91 males per female. The median age was 46.2 years (compared with 37.4 years nationally), with 123 people (18.9%) aged under 15 years, 102 (15.7%) aged 15 to 29, 342 (52.5%) aged 30 to 64, and 84 (12.9%) aged 65 or older.

Ethnicities were 88.9% European/Pākehā, 12.9% Māori, 3.7% Pacific peoples, 5.1% Asian, and 1.8% other ethnicities (totals add to more than 100% since people could identify with multiple ethnicities).

The proportion of people born overseas was 18.0%, compared with 27.1% nationally.

Although some people objected to giving their religion, 57.1% had no religion, 32.7% were Christian, 0.9% were Hindu, 0.5% were Muslim, 1.8% were Buddhist and 2.8% had other religions.

Of those at least 15 years old, 87 (16.5%) people had a bachelor or higher degree, and 105 (19.9%) people had no formal qualifications. The median income was $39,700, compared with $31,800 nationally. The employment status of those at least 15 was that 291 (55.1%) people were employed full-time, 84 (15.9%) were part-time, and 15 (2.8%) were unemployed.

References

Lower Hutt
Headlands of the Wellington Region
Wellington Harbour
Populated places around the Wellington Harbour